Charles Paul McClelland (December 19, 1854 – June 6, 1944) was a judge of the United States Customs Court and previously was a Member of the Board of General Appraisers.

Education and career

Born on December 19, 1854, in Glenluce, Scotland, McClelland received a Bachelor of Laws from New York University School of Law in 1880. He was admitted to the bar the same year, and practiced law in Dobbs Ferry, New York. He was a member of the New York State Assembly (Westchester Co, 1st D.) in 1885 and 1886. He was deputy Collector of the Port of New York from December 1886 to March 1890. He was again a member of the State Assembly in 1891. He was a member of the New York State Senate (12th D.) in 1892, 1893 and 1903.

Federal judicial service

McClelland received a recess appointment from President Theodore Roosevelt on August 21, 1903, to a seat on the Board of General Appraisers vacated by Member James A. Jewell. He was nominated to the same position by President Roosevelt on November 10, 1903. He was confirmed by the United States Senate on December 7, 1903, and received his commission on December 8, 1903. McClelland was reassigned by operation of law to the United States Customs Court on May 28, 1926, to a new Associate Justice (Judge from June 17, 1930) seat authorized by 44 Stat. 669. He served as Presiding Judge from 1934 to 1939. His service terminated on September 30, 1939, due to his retirement. He was succeeded by Judge Webster Oliver.

Death

McClelland died on June 6, 1944, in Dobbs Ferry.

References

External links
 The New York Red Book compiled by Edgar L. Murlin (published by James B. Lyon, Albany NY, 1897; pg. 404, 504f and 509)
 Biographical sketches of the members of the Legislature in The Evening Journal Almanac (1892)
 New York State Legislative Souvenir for 1893 with Portraits of the Members of Both Houses by Henry P. Phelps (pg. 14)

1854 births
1944 deaths
Judges of the United States Customs Court
New York University School of Law alumni
Members of the Board of General Appraisers
New York (state) state senators
Members of the New York State Assembly
People from Dobbs Ferry, New York
United States Article I federal judges appointed by Theodore Roosevelt
20th-century American judges
Presidents of the Saint Andrew's Society of the State of New York